Association Sportive de Tennis de Table de Chartres is a table tennis club based in Chartres, France. One of the best teams in the country in the recent years, it won the French top division Pro A both in 2012 and 2013. Chartres also has respectable results in continental competitions, having won the ETTU Cup in 2011 and finishing runner-up in the European Champions League in 2013.

Honours
Pro A:
Winner: 2012, 2013
ETTU Cup:
Winner: 2011
European Champions League:
Runner-up: 2013

Team

Roster
  Damien Éloi
  Robert Gardos
  Pär Gerell
  João Monteiro
  Gao Ning

Staff members
  Club President: Loïc Bréhu
  Treasurer: Jacques Maupu
  Coach: Calin Toma

References

External links

Table tennis clubs in France
Sports clubs established in 2003
2003 establishments in France